Smithsonian is a science and nature magazine, and the official journal published by the Smithsonian Institution in Washington, D.C.; although editorially independent from its parent organization. The first issue was published in 1970. The Smithsonian holds events such as the American Ingenuity Awards, Future Con and Museum Day.

History
The history of Smithsonian began when Edward K. Thompson, the retired editor of Life magazine, was asked by the then-Secretary of the Smithsonian, S. Dillon Ripley, to produce a magazine "about things in which the Smithsonian [Institution] is interested, might be interested or ought to be interested."

Thompson would later recall that his philosophy for the new magazine was that it "would stir curiosity in already receptive minds. It would deal with history as it is relevant to the present. It would present art, since true art is never dated, in the richest possible reproduction. It would peer into the future via coverage of social progress and of science and technology. Technical matters would be digested and made intelligible by skilled writers who would stimulate readers to reach upward while not turning them off with jargon. We would find the best writers and the best photographers—not unlike the best of the old Life."

In 1973, the magazine turned a profit for the first time. By 1974, circulation had nearly quadrupled, to 635,000, and it reached the one million milestone in 1975—one of the most successful launches of its time. In 1980, Thompson was replaced by Don Moser, who had also worked at Life, and circulation reached upwards of two million, in turn, by Carey Winfrey upon his retirement in 2001. Michael Caruso succeeded Carey Winfrey in 2011, and served as editor-in-chief until 2019. Since that time Deborah Rosenberg and Terence Monmaney have served as executive editors.

Events held

Smithsonian American Ingenuity Awards
Every year since 2012, the magazine has sponsored the American Ingenuity Awards, a recognition of innovation in the arts, sciences and technology. Winners have included Bryan Stevenson, Elon Musk, Lin-Manuel Miranda, OK Go, John Krasinski, Dave Eggers, Aziz Ansari, Rosanne Cash, Jeff Bezos, Fred Armisen, Bill Hader and David Lynch.

Presenters have included Stephen Hawking (twice), Stephen Colbert, David Byrne, Herbie Hancock, Erin Brockovich, Ruben Blades, Bill Nye, Art Spiegelman and Senator Al Franken.

The American Ingenuity Award itself was created by the artist Jeff Koons.

Future Con 
Future Con, formerly The Future is Here, is an annual conference for students and young people interested in science and science fiction, held as part of Washington D.C.'s Awesome Con.

Museum Day 

Smithsonian arranges Museum Day, when museums in all 50 U.S. states offer limited free admission. In 2018, over 1,400 museums participated. 

The offer is free admission for the ticket holder plus one guest, and this ticket is specific to the chosen museum only. The intention is one ticket per person. This is in contrast to the International Museum Day, when participating museums generally offer entirely free admission throughout the day.

Contributors
Notable past and current contributors to Smithsonian have included:

 Richard Conniff
 Frank Deford
 Eileen Gunn
 Penn Jillette
 Jon Krakauer
 Jill Lepore
 Franz Lidz
 Alan Lightman
 Jo Marchant
 David McCullough
 Susan Orlean
 Nathaniel Philbrick
 Paul Theroux

References

External links
 Official website

1970 establishments in Washington, D.C.
English-language magazines
History magazines published in the United States
Magazines established in 1970
Magazines published in Washington, D.C.
Monthly magazines published in the United States
Science and technology magazines published in the United States
Smithsonian Institution publications
Webby Award winners